The McCurry-Kidd House, located at 602 W. Howell St. in Hartwell, Georgia, was listed on the National Register of Historic Places in 1986.

It is a two-story, brick, Georgian-revival house built in c.1920-24.  It was a home of Dr. Edgar McCurry (1877-1962).

It is located on the north side of Howell Street near its intersection with Franklin Street. It was designed by architect Willis Irwin.  Its NRHP nomination identified it as the only example of Georgian Revival style in Hartwell.

The listing included a second contributing building.

There is also a "McCurry House" included in the Benson Street-Forest Avenue Residential Historic District in Hartwell.

References

Houses on the National Register of Historic Places in Georgia (U.S. state)
Colonial Revival architecture in Georgia (U.S. state)
Houses completed in 1920
Houses in Hart County, Georgia
National Register of Historic Places in Hart County, Georgia
1920 establishments in Georgia (U.S. state)